Gregory Frers (born August 4, 1971) is a former professional Canadian football player who played ten years in the Canadian Football League. Frers played defensive back for the Calgary Stampeders, Winnipeg Blue Bombers and BC Lions from 1993 to 2002. He was part of the Stampeders 1998 and 2001 Grey Cup winning teams. Frers was an All-Star in 2000 and he also won the Tom Pate Memorial Award in 2002. He played CIS football at Simon Fraser University.

After playing, he became a CFL analyst for the CBC.

External links
CBC bio

1971 births
Living people
BC Lions players
Calgary Stampeders players
Canadian football defensive backs
Canadian Football League announcers
Players of Canadian football from Ontario
Simon Fraser Clan football players
Simon Fraser University alumni
Sportspeople from Mississauga
Winnipeg Blue Bombers players